The New Westminster Royals was the name of several professional ice hockey teams based in New Westminster, British Columbia, first established in 1911 for the Pacific Coast Hockey Association (PCHA). Though nominally based in New Westminster, the team played its home games at the Denman Arena in nearby Vancouver, as an arena was not available; the team would never play a PCHA home game in New Westminster as a result. They won the inaugural PCHA championship in 1912, though financial difficulties saw the team relocated to Portland, Oregon in 1914 and become the Portland Rosebuds.

History
The first team played from 1911–1914 in the Pacific Coast Hockey Association (PCHA) which was established in 1911. The team was notable as it was the inaugural 1911–12 champion of the PCHA. It would be the only league championship the Royals would earn. Their home arena was the Denman Arena in Vancouver.

The name was revived for a club that played in the Pacific Coast Hockey League from 1945 to 1952 and the Western Hockey League from 1952 to 1959.  The Royals won the President's Cup in 1949–1950 as PCHL champions.

Junior team
The New Westminster Royals name was revived for a junior-level franchise in the Pacific Coast Junior Hockey League (PCJHL) in 1962, winning five-straight PCJHL championships before movingwith league mates Victoria Cougarsinto the British Columbia Junior Hockey League (BCJHL) for the 1967–68 season. The Royals played on-and-off from 1962 to 1991 in the years when the major junior New Westminster Bruins were not playing. In 1991, the Royals relocated across the Pattullo Bridge to neighbouring Surrey, changing their name to Surrey Eagles.

Head coaches
Jimmy Gardner (1911–1913)
Pete Muldoon (1913–1914)

References

Bibliography

 
 
 

1911 establishments in British Columbia
1918 disestablishments in British Columbia
Defunct ice hockey teams in British Columbia
Pacific Coast Hockey Association teams
Ice hockey clubs disestablished in 1918
Ice hockey clubs established in 1911
Defunct British Columbia Hockey League teams
New Westminster
Western Hockey League (1952–1974) teams